Associação Atlética Caldense, commonly known as Caldense, is a Brazilian professional association football club based in Poços de Caldas, Minas Gerais. The team plays in Série D, the fourth tier of the Brazilian football league system, as well as in the Campeonato Mineiro, the top tier of the Minas Gerais state football league.

Founded on 7 September 1925, it plays its games at the Dr. Ronaldo Junqueira Stadium (Ronaldão). Its colors are green and white and the parakeet is the mascot. In addition to professional football, the club also fields teams in futsal, swimming, volleyball, basketball, tennis, shuttlecock, cricket, table tennis and several others. Historically, its biggest rival is Rio Branco de Andradas Futebol Clube.

Caldense play in green and white uniforms.

History
Caldense was founded on 7 September 1925, in Poços de Caldas, by Fosco Pardini and João de Moura Gavião. De Moura Gavião was a dissident member of a local team called Foot-Ball Club Caldense.

In 1928, Associação Atlética Caldense and Gambrinus Futebol Clube fused.

Caldense's first stadium, called Cristiano Osório, was built by Local Futebol Clube in 1923 and was brought by Caldense in 1925.

Titles
 Campeonato Mineiro: 2002
 Campeonato Mineiro Módulo II: 1971
 Campeonato Mineiro do Interior: 1975, 2002 and 2015

Stadium

Caldense plays at the municipal stadium Estádio Ronaldão, built in 1979, with a maximum capacity of 14,000 people.

Trivia
On November 22, 1968, the club played their first match in Belo Horizonte city, against Cruzeiro at Independência stadium. The match ended 3–0 in favour of Cruzeiro.

References

External links
Caldense Official Website

 
Association football clubs established in 1925
Football clubs in Minas Gerais
1925 establishments in Brazil